Kiowa County is a county located in the U.S. state of Colorado. As of the 2020 census, the population was 1,446, making it the fifth-least populous county in Colorado. The county seat is Eads. The county was named for the Kiowa Nation of Native Americans.

History

Sand Creek massacre

On November 29, 1864, more than a decade before Colorado became a state and long before Kiowa County was formed, a massacre of Native Americans—a group of old men, women, and children—occurred on Sand Creek that initially was greeted as a victory in the Colorado War against hostile Indians; within months, Congressional inquiries revealed a different picture, and a national scandal erupted. It happened in what is now Kiowa County and is known as the Sand Creek Massacre.

Territorial Governor John Evans eventually lost his job for his part in setting up the incident, and Colonel John Chivington, commander of the U.S. forces, was castigated by the United States Congress, and the scandal followed him for the rest of his life. Evans would go on to make significant important contributions to the early Denver community, and while Chivington also made some, his reputation remained tainted, while Evans is still honored today.

The location was not positively identified until 1999, and in 2005, the National Park Service established the Sand Creek Massacre National Historic Site. Currently, the facilities include a small visitor's center, two walking trails, signage, and monuments overlooking the massacre site.  The massacre site itself is off-limits to visitors.

Railroad and agriculture in the 1880s
In the late 1880s, eastern Colorado attracted a lot of attention by farming interests that didn't yet know that long-term agriculture was unsustainable in this arid landscape, and the railroads were snaking west across the plains towards the gold fields of the Rocky Mountains during the Colorado Gold Rush. The Missouri Pacific Railroad crossed into what would soon become Kiowa County, Colorado, from Kansas in 1887.

Several small camps for railroad workers were established just over the border from Kansas, and beginning after the town of Sheridan Lake, new towns and camps were sequentially named, alphabetically, starting with "A" and proceeding westward along the railroad line.

Arden, Brandon, Chivington, Diston, Eads, Fergus, Galatea, Haswell, Inman, Joliet, and Kilburn appeared one after another, some developing into towns, others being only a pipe dream in the eyes of developers. Chivington was intended as a major watering stop for the railroad (a 60-room, $10,000 "crown jewel" hotel was initially built there), but the water was too alkaline to use and the trains instead stopped in Kansas to tank up. The hotel was soon torn down, its materials shipped to other Colorado locations to use in constructing other facilities—a common occurrence in late 19th century Colorado, as boom towns went bust.

Kiowa County was established in 1889, taking its name from the Kiowa Indians who lived in eastern Colorado before the Europeans arrived. Sheridan Lake was the county seat of Kiowa County and was not at first a stop on the railroad line; only after local citizens built a railroad depot and turned it over to the Missouri Pacific did the railroad build a telegraph station and make Sheridan Lake a stop. The county seat moved to rival Eads in 1902.

Kiowa County today
Agriculture in eastern Colorado collapsed in the dust bowl days of the 1930s; today mostly dry-land farms and some ranching interests survive. Colorado's Front Range cities and agriculture interests upstream have acquired most of the water rights, and the groundwater aquifers are drying up. Kiowa County faces ever-decreasing water supplies and further economic decline.

It is conceivable that much of the county will eventually revert to its original sparse grassland and prairie conditions of the pre-1880s.

Today Eads, along the old railroad line, is the largest town in the county. It is the Kiowa county seat, serves the surviving farming and ranching interests, and hosts the county's largest high school. Sheridan Lake does have a combined junior-and-senior high, and still surviving in some form are the towns of Towner, Arlington, Brandon, Chivington, and Haswell.

Geography

Significant drainage basins in the county are Adobe-Johns Creek and Mustang Creek which drain the county's
western part, Rush Creek and Big Sandy Creek in the central part and Wildhorse, 
Buffalo, and White Woman Creeks in the eastern part.  The draws tend to be 
intermittent, however Adobe-Johns, Rush and Big Sandy Creeks have small continuous flows during 
wetter years. Each of these creeks ultimately drain to the Arkansas River.

Adjacent counties
 Cheyenne County - north
 Greeley County, Kansas - east
 Bent County - south
 Prowers County - south
 Otero County - southwest
 Crowley County - west
 Lincoln County - northwest

Major Highways
  U.S. Highway 287
  U.S. Highway 385
  State Highway 96

National protected area
 Sand Creek Massacre National Historic Site

Bicycle route
 TransAmerica Trail Bicycle Route

Demographics

As of the census of 2000, there were 1,622 people, 665 households, and 452 families residing in the county. The population density was 1 people per square mile (2.59/km2). There were 817 housing units at an average density of 0.457 per square mile (0.177/km2). The racial makeup of the county was 96.12% White, 0.49% Black or African American, 1.11% Native American, 0.06% Pacific Islander, 1.42% from other races, and 0.80% from two or more races. 3.14% of the population were Hispanic or Latino of any race.

There were 665 households, out of which 28.90% had children under the age of 18 living with them, 57.60% were married couples living together, 6.60% had a female householder with no husband present, and 32.00% were non-families. 29.80% of all households were made up of individuals, and 15.20% had someone living alone who was 65 years of age or older. The average household size was 2.40 and the average family size was 2.97.

In the county, the population was spread out, with 25.90% under the age of 18, 7.30% from 18 to 24, 24.70% from 25 to 44, 24.60% from 45 to 64, and 17.60% who were 65 years of age or older. The median age was 40 years. For every 100 females, there were 100.00 males. For every 100 females age 18 and over, there were 97.40 males.

The median income for a household in the county was $30,494, and the median income for a family was $35,536. Males had a median income of $26,136 versus $18,897 for females. The per capita income for the county was $16,382. About 9.60% of families and 12.20% of the population were below the poverty line, including 11.50% of those under age 18 and 13.80% of those age 65 or over.

Over six percent of the population were Quakers–one of the highest percentages in the country.

Politics
Kiowa is, like all of the High Plains, an overwhelmingly Republican county. The last Democrat to carry it was Lyndon Johnson in 1964, and since 1980, only Michael Dukakis in 1988 –during a major farm crisis brought upon by drought– has topped 30% of the county's vote for the Democratic Party. The past six Democratic candidates for president have not surpassed 22% of the county's vote, and both Hillary Clinton and Joe Biden barely reached ten percent.

Communities

Towns
 Eads
 Haswell
 Sheridan Lake

Census-designated places
 Brandon
 Towner

Other unincorporated places
 Arlington
 Chivington

See also

Outline of Colorado
Index of Colorado-related articles
National Register of Historic Places listings in Kiowa County, Colorado

References

External links
 Kiowa County Government
 Kiowa County information
 Kiowa County history
 Colorado County Evolution by Don Stanwyck
 Colorado Historical Society

 
Colorado counties
Colorado placenames of Native American origin
1889 establishments in Colorado
Eastern Plains
Populated places established in 1889